Edge O' Beyond is a 1919 British silent drama film directed by Fred W. Durrant and starring Ruby Miller, Owen Nares and Isobel Elsom. It is an adaptation of the 1908 novel The Edge O' Beyond by Gertrude Page, one of her bestsellers set in Rhodesia. It was shot at the Isleworth Studios in West London. Ruby Miller had previously appeared in a West End stage version of the novel.

Cast
 Ruby Miller as Dinah Webberley
 Owen Nares as Dr. Cecil Lawson
 Isobel Elsom as Joyce Grey
 C. M. Hallard as Captain Burnett
 Minna Grey as Dulcie Maitland
 Fred Raynham as Oswald Grant
 James Lindsay as Major Egerton

References

Bibliography
 Bamford, Kenton. Distorted images: British national identity and film in the 1920s. I.B. Tauris, 1999.
 Free, Melissa. Beyond Gold and Diamonds: Genre, the Authorial Informant, and the British South African Novel. SUNY Press, 2021.
 Low, Rachael. The History of the British Film 1918-1929. George Allen & Unwin, 1971.

External links

1919 films
1919 drama films
British silent feature films
British drama films
Films directed by Fred W. Durrant
Films set in Rhodesia
Films based on British novels
Films shot at Isleworth Studios
1910s English-language films
1910s British films
Silent drama films